Summer Love also known as Dead Man's Bounty, is a 2006 Polish Western film written and directed by Piotr Uklański. It stars Bogusław Linda, Karel Roden, and Val Kilmer.

Plot 
The plot involves a desert countryside with a group of rowdy cowboys, a woman bar tender and a drunkard sheriff.

A peaceful village suddenly turns violent when a certain stranger walks into a bar with the poster of a wanted man. He enters into a scuffle with other cowboys. He manages to escape from the clutches of the locals and then is chased by them.

References

External links 
 
 
 Interview in German, Spike Art

2006 films
2006 Western (genre) films
Polish Western (genre) films
2000s English-language films
English-language Polish films